Dr. Gyula Krajczár (1953–1998) was a Hungarian politician, who served as mayor of Komárom from 1990 to 1998. He was elected mayor for the third term on October 18, 1998, however he died soon that year. He was replaced by János Zatykó during a by-election in 1999.

References

External links
 Dr. Krajczár Gyula emléktábla, Komárom

1953 births
1998 deaths
Hungarian Socialist Party politicians
Mayors of places in Hungary